Elisângela Paolino (born 29 April 1980) is a Brazilian female volleyball player.

Clubs
  Força Olímpica (1996–2000)
  Macaé Sports (2000–2001)
  Upis Brasilia (2001–2002)
  EC União Suzano (2001–2002)
  Numune SK Ankara (2002–2003)
  Beşiktaş (2003–2004)
  SSK Ankara (2004–2005)
  JT Marvelous (2005–2006)
  Castellana Grotte (2006–2007)
   San Vito Volley (2009–2010)
   Azerrail Baku (2010–2011)
  Hisamitsu Springs (2012–2013)
   Brasília Vôlei (2013–2014)
  Maranhão Vôlei (2014–2015)
  Club Voleibol Murillo (2016)
  Pursaklar Belediyesi (2016–2017)
  Khonkaen Star (2017–2018)

References

1980 births
Living people
Brazilian women's volleyball players
Expatriate volleyball players in Turkey
Opposite hitters
Expatriate volleyball players in Japan
Expatriate volleyball players in Italy
Expatriate volleyball players in Azerbaijan
Expatriate volleyball players in Spain
Expatriate volleyball players in Thailand
Brazilian expatriate sportspeople in Japan
Brazilian expatriate sportspeople in Turkey
Brazilian expatriate sportspeople in Spain
Brazilian expatriates in Italy
Brazilian expatriate sportspeople in Azerbaijan
Brazilian expatriate sportspeople in Thailand